Columbia High School (or CHS) is  a public high school located on Luther Road in East Greenbush, New York, USA. It is the only high school for the East Greenbush Central School District and has a 2019-20 enrollment of approximately 1,230 students in grades 9-12. The school has a thirteen to one student to teacher ratio that is below the state average. Columbia High School, commonly referred to CHS, is home to the "Blue Devils".  The principal is Michael Harkin, who replaced John Sawchuk in January 2018.

Academics
The school offers eleven Advanced Placement classes in: Biology, Calculus AB, Calculus BC, Economics: Micro, English Literature & Composition, Environmental Science, European History, Physics, Chemistry, U.S. History, and World History.

Notable alumni
 Alexander Bauer, visual artist.
Rich Romer, professional football player, Cincinnati Bengals
 Jacob Clemente, Broadway performer.
 Jennifer Farley, television personality, MTV's Jersey Shore.
 Brian Lashoff, professional hockey player, currently under contract with the Detroit Red Wings.
 Kevin Smith, professional baseball player for the Toronto Blue Jays.
 Ernie Stautner, professional football player, coach and Pro Football Hall of Famer
 Tyler Szalkowski, guitarist of the pop-rock band State Champs
 Danielle Roberts, physician involved in the NXIVM cult scandal

References

External links
 East Greenbush Central School District website
 Columbia High School website

Public high schools in New York (state)
Schools in Rensselaer County, New York